The chlorite ion, or chlorine dioxide anion, is the halite with the chemical formula of . A chlorite (compound) is a compound that contains this group, with chlorine in the oxidation state of +3. Chlorites are also known as salts of chlorous acid.

Compounds

The free acid, chlorous acid HClO2, is the least stable oxoacid of chlorine and has only been observed as an aqueous solution at low concentrations. Since it cannot be concentrated, it is not a commercial product. The alkali metal and alkaline earth metal compounds are all colorless or pale yellow, with sodium chlorite (NaClO2) being the only commercially important chlorite. Heavy metal chlorites (Ag+, Hg+, Tl+, Pb2+, and also Cu2+ and ) are unstable and decompose explosively with heat or shock.

Sodium chlorite is derived indirectly from sodium chlorate, NaClO3. First, the explosively unstable gas chlorine dioxide, ClO2 is produced by reducing sodium chlorate with a suitable reducing agent such as methanol, hydrogen peroxide, hydrochloric acid or sulfur dioxide.

Structure and properties
The chlorite ion adopts a bent molecular geometry, due to the effects of the lone pairs on the chlorine atom, with an O–Cl–O bond angle of 111° and Cl–O bond lengths of 156 pm.
Chlorite is the strongest oxidiser of the chlorine oxyanions on the basis of standard half cell potentials.

Uses
The most important chlorite is sodium chlorite (NaClO2); this is used in the bleaching of textiles, pulp, and paper, however despite its strongly oxidizing nature it is often not used directly being instead used to generate the neutral species chlorine dioxide (ClO2), normally via a reaction with HCl:

5 NaClO2 + 4 HCl → 5 NaCl + 4 ClO2 + 2 H2O

Other oxyanions
These are part of a greater family of other chlorine oxides.

See also
 Tetrachlorodecaoxide, a chlorite-based drug
 Chloryl,

References

Kirk-Othmer Concise Encyclopedia of Chemistry, Martin Grayson, Editor, John Wiley & Sons, Inc., 1985

 
Chlorine oxides